Ole Wøhlers Olsen (born 1942) is Denmark's ambassador to Algeria.

Olsen, a practicing Muslim, has been employed by Denmark's Foreign Ministry since 1969. He has served in Morocco, Algeria, Saudi Arabia, Rwanda, Chile and Peru. In 1993, he completed a bicycle pilgrimage to Mecca.

The Danish government strongly supported the US-led invasion of Iraq, 2003, and in what was seen as recognition of the Scandinavian country's support for the coalition, Olsen was appointed to the position as coordinator for one of the four US-led provisional authorities, that in Southern Iraq, stationed in Basra. The other three coordinators were Americans. Olsen has, however, criticized his US superiors in Baghdad for the lack of support for his reconstruction efforts, and for providing him with too little assistance, for instance on security back-up. He was suddenly replaced on July 28, three and a half months before his contract was due to end. He then returned to his former posting in Damascus as the Danish ambassador to Syria.

After Syria, he returned to Denmark, where he worked at the Danish Institute of International Studies for 1 year as a senior consultant. In 2006, he was sent on his latest posting; as the Danish ambassador to Algeria.

Notes

1942 births
Living people
Ambassadors of Denmark to Algeria
Ambassadors of Denmark to Syria
Danish diplomats